Diacanthos is a genus of green algae in the family Chlorellaceae.

References

External links

Chlorellaceae
Trebouxiophyceae genera